Rachele Brooke Smith (born November 7, 1987) is an American actress and dancer. She has started in several films such as Center Stage: Turn It Up, Bring It On: Fight to the Finish, Atomic Shark, Legend of the White Dragon, and many more.

Personal life
Smith was married to Emilio Palafox on June 25, 2022.

Filmography

Film

Television

Web

Music videos

References

External links

1987 births
Actresses from Arizona
American female dancers
American dancers
American film actresses
Living people
21st-century American women